Edward Ives may refer to:
Edward Ives (rower) (born 1961), American Olympic rower
Edward Ives (toymaker) (1839–1918), founder of Ives Manufacturing
Edward D. Ives (1925–2009), American folklorist
Edward H. Ives (1819–1892), member of the Wisconsin State Senate